Novogireyevo is a Moscow Metro station on the Kalininsko-Solntsevskaya Line. It was constructed in 1979 in Moscow's Novogireyevo District, as the final terminus of the Kalininsky radius. The status of terminus ended following the inauguration of Novokosino, extension to the east, on August 30, 2012. The station has entrances at both ends, and is at a depth of nine metres. About 110 000 passengers use Novogireyevo station daily.

Architecture
The station was designed by Robert Pogrebnoi and Plyukhin. The station was the first of the newer version of the pillar-trispan with the step of the pillars further increased from 6 to 7.5 metres. The pillars are revetted with light-grey marble and the walls are revetted with steel blue marble. The upper parts of the pillars and the walls are decorated with friezes devoted to the nature of the Moscow area (by A. Kuznetsov). The floor is faced with slabs of red and brown granite and strips of white marble.

Moscow Metro stations
Railway stations in Russia opened in 1979
Kalininsko-Solntsevskaya line
Railway stations located underground in Russia